The FIBT World Championships 1937 took place in Cortina d'Ampezzo, Italy (Two-man) and in St. Moritz, Switzerland (Four-man). St. Moritz hosted the four-man event previously in 1931 and 1935.

Two man bobsleigh

Four man bobsleigh
 

The American team became the first non-Europeans to medal at the championships.

Medal table

References

External links
2-Man bobsleigh World Champions
4-Man bobsleigh World Champions

IBSF World Championships
Sport in Cortina d'Ampezzo
Sport in St. Moritz
1937 in bobsleigh
1937 in Italian sport
International sports competitions hosted by Italy
Bobsleigh in Italy